The Programa Pueblos Mágicos  ("Magical Towns Programme") is an initiative led by Mexico's Secretariat of Tourism, with support from other federal agencies, to promote a series of towns around the country that offer visitors special experiences because of their natural beauty, cultural richness, traditions, folklore, historical relevance, cuisine, art crafts, and great hospitality. It is intended to increase tourism to more localities, especially smaller towns in rural areas. 

The program promotes visiting small, rural towns, where visitors may see indigenous crafts, spectacular landscapes and other attractions. The Government created the 'Pueblos Mágicos' program to recognize places across the country that have certain characteristics and traditions that make them unique, and historically significant, offering magical experiences to visitors. A "Magical Village" is a place with symbolism, legends, history, important events, festivals, traditions, great food, and enjoyable shopping, day-to-day life – in other words, "magic" in its social and cultural manifestations, with great opportunities for tourism. Every Pueblo Magico offers a special experience to the visitor.The programme was launched in 2001. After 9 years and 32 towns having been selected, it was improved and relaunched in 2010. The government added resources to support local efforts and made it a priority under Secretary Guevara. Every town was assigned a budget to continue improving its infrastructure, image, product offering, and experience, while making sure they were maintaining their traditions and their festivals were promoted. By 2012 a total of 83 towns and villages in all 31 states have been awarded the title or nomination of Pueblo Mágico. The program created pride, recognition for its local citizens, and a diversification strategy to promote culture and Mexican traditions.

The program has offered opportunities to more citizens to make a living from tourism. This has contributed significantly to the economies of not only the pueblos, but also entire regions. Visitors' spending has stimulated the development of jobs, highly important in the towns with the most economic needs. Towns with more than five thousand residents are receiving more than 20 thousand visitors during the weekends. 

In late 2018 it was reported that the program would be canceled and would not continue for 2019 due to the lack of support of the president Andrés Manuel López Obrador (AMLO). However, in February 2019 Humberto Hernández, Under-secretary of Development and Tourist Regulation in the Ministry of Tourism, said that the program would continue "more strongly than ever." Under the new decentralized strategy, while the tourism ministry will continue to handle qualification of prospective pueblos mágicos and promotion and branding of the program, state governors will handle the allocation of government funds to projects in the towns.

A new class of 11 Pueblos Mágicos was inducted into the program on 1 December 2020, bringing the total to 132. This included the reinstatement of Mexcaltitán, one of the original Pueblos Mágicos, after it lost the designation in 2009.

 Objectives 
The objectives of this program are:
  To structure a supplementary and diversified touristic supply within the interior of the country for locations that contain important historical and cultural attributes.
 To diversify the country's tourism offerings.
 To create and promote craftsmanship and support traditional festivals.
 To preserve local traditions, culture, ethnic customs and the unique cuisine. 
 To create tourist products like adventures, extreme sports, ecotourism, festivals, local itineraries, wine and food activities and sport fishing.
 To reassess, consolidate and reinforce touristic attractions of these towns in the country which represent fresh and different alternatives to meet the rising demand of national and international visitors. 
 To create jobs and reduce poverty.
 This program was also developed with the purpose of recognizing the labor of its residents who have kept their cultural and historical riches of their home towns.

 Criteria 
In order to qualify for the program, towns should have a population of at least 5000, and be located no more than 300 km, or the equivalent of traveling three hours by land, from a city with a well-resourced market or good connectivity. The town's municipal and state authorities must request incorporation from the Secretariat of Tourism so that assessment visits can be arranged to evaluate the potential of the site. In addition, towns had to meet specific requirements in order to be considered. 

The criteria included some of the following:

I.  A formally constituted "Pueblo Mágico committee", citizens who represent the pueblo or local community. If the town is accepted into the program, they are responsible for maintaining the designation by working with the local citizens. Their job is to represent the residents of the town and their interests to make sure that the declaration will benefit all and by working together to maximise the opportunities. This group has to be diverse, with no more than 15 people who are willing to contribute their work pro-bono. Group members should rotate periodically.

II. A town council accord, which states an agreement to apply for admittance into the program. The local authorities have to support inclusion in the program, as their support is essential for success. This document affirms the formal support.

III. Agreement of the state congress; state support is needed to assign resources, mainly for infrastructure.

IV.  Direct economic contribution towards touristic development in projects, action plans and programs. Each town must try to differentiate from other towns. The plans should relate to the unique features of the town and why it should be considered. 

V. An updated municipal touristic development program, with a time frame of at least three years. A long-term plan should be for 3 years to make sure the declaration is maintained, and that the town is working to improve conditions for tourists. The program should be updated every three years.

VI.  Rules and local regulations should be updated to have a touristic focus during the current administration of the Municipality. This is to support and protect visitors and people dedicated to tourism activities. 

VII. Evidence of the symbolic attraction of the aspiring community, or what makes the town unique.
 
VIII. Availability of health and public security services for tourists in case of an emergency.

IX.  Documentation of private and social investment in touristic development and quality, including hotel rooms, restaurants, tours, museums, activities, etc.

X. Other elements that the committee considers relevant for touristic activity.

 Process 
 The Pueblo's citizens committee and relevant stakeholders create the file containing all documents, details fulfilling all the requirements, and the request of candidacy to the Secretary of Tourism and the evaluation committee.
 A formal presentation with examples and details is made to the evaluation committee during a scheduled appointment in Mexico City.
 The formal committee has representation from Secretariats of Tourism, Culture, Environment and several other government officials.
 The evaluation committee reviews the file, ensures that all the requirements were met, conducts a physical inspection in the town, and reports back by documenting findings.
 If 100% of the requirements are met then they approve the nomination and turn matters over to the Secretary of Tourism who is responsible to visit the Pueblo, invite the local authorities and local residents, and give the new "nomination" or declaration at the same time that it has to take the oath to the local committee representing the citizens of the town.
 The local citizens and the committee are responsible to maintain the declaration and the town's "magic" standing. Nominations are not permanent, with annual revisions and audits for some towns.
 If an applying pueblo doesn't meet the requirements, the details are shared back to the committee, and the pueblo will be asked to provide any requested missing information. 
 If the Pueblo doesn't qualify due to inability to meet the required attributes, a formal response is provided to the committee.

Mexico has more than 2500 municipalities; hundreds apply annually to this program with very few of them being selected. This is a very successful and prestigious program that provides benefits to local residents who benefit from the resulting economic activity bringing prosperity and various tangible and intangible benefits to their communities.

 List 

 Towns removed from the program 

Below is the list of sites that were enrolled in the program, but had their titles revoked for failure to meet standards during the re-evaluation or audit. One of them received enhanced recognition as a UNESCO World Heritage Site; the other two were subsequently brought into compliance and reinstated as Pueblos Mágicos.

 Other 
Some governments have tried to eliminate the program for political reasons but because this model is a citizen-based program focusing on empowering communities, these efforts have been unsuccessful. According to statistics from INEGI, the Pueblo Mágico program has provided great economic value, and created jobs for its participating communities. The program has been recognised by several countries around the world, as a role model domestically and internationally.

See also
Barrios Mágicos of Mexico City
Pueblo Patrimonio (Colombia)
Pueblos Mágicos (Ecuador)
Pueblos Pintorescos (Guatemala)

References

External links

Secretariat of Tourism — Pueblos Mágicos — official website'' (Spanish).
Visitmexico.com: The Pueblos Mágicos—Magical Towns — (Spanish).
Pueblos Mágico de Jerez — (Spanish).
Valle de Bravo - locale Pueblos Mágicos — (Spanish).
Map with all the Magical Towns of Mexico - (English)

 
Populated places in Mexico
Tourism in Mexico
Tourist attractions in Mexico

Mexico